The 1997 AMP Bathurst 1000 was the 38th running of the annual Bathurst 1000 touring car race. It was held on 5 October 1997 at the Mount Panorama Circuit just outside Bathurst in New South Wales, Australia. It was the first Bathurst 1000 race held after the controversial split between race organisers, the Australian Racing Drivers Club, and V8 Supercar, which led to Australia's leading touring car category contesting a separate 1000 kilometre race at Bathurst. That race, the 1997 Primus 1000 Classic, was held two weeks after the AMP Bathurst 1000.

The 1997 AMP Bathurst 1000 was open to Super Touring Cars and featured teams from Australia, New Zealand and Great Britain. It could thus be considered as the first "international" Bathurst endurance race since the 1992 Tooheys 1000, which was the last Bathurst 1000 to be contested by cars complying with Australian regulations based on FIA Group A rules.

The race was won by brothers Geoff Brabham and David Brabham, driving a BMW 320i for BMW Motorsport Australia. The car of teammates Paul Morris and Craig Baird had initially been declared the winner of the race but was later disqualified as Baird had breached the race regulation which limited any one driver to a maximum of three hours continuous driving; they were placed 27th & last. A late race error saw the BMW Motorsport Australia team leave Baird in the car at the final pit stop instead of putting Morris in the car for the run to the chequered flag. This mistake cost the team a 1–2 finish for BMW. It was the second time in Geoff Brabham's career that he had won a major endurance race with his brother as a co-driver. The middle of the three Brabham brothers Gary, was one of Geoff's co-drivers when he won the IMSA 1991 Coca-Cola 12 Hours of Sebring.

Top Ten Run-off
The fastest ten cars from qualifying contested a one lap "Top Ten Run-off" on the Saturday to determine the first ten grid places for the race.

* 1997 was the first time in which a car Peter Brock was entered in was driven in the runoff by his co-driver. In this case it was Vauxhall Sport team owner and former Formula One driver Derek Warwick who was in the drivers seat. Brock had in fact rolled the #05 Vauxhall Vectra coming into Caltex Chase during qualifying.* Derek Warwick became the 6th ex-Formula One driver to appear in the runoff following Jack Brabham, Derek Bell, Larry Perkins, Alan Jones and David Brabham.* Paul Morris' pole time of 2:16.5958 was 5.5798 seconds slower than Glenn Seton's 1996 pole time of 2:11.0160 set in a V8 powered Ford EF Falcon showing the difference in speed between the Australian 5.0 litre V8 formula and the 2.0 litre Super Touring cars.* Eight of the ten drivers were making their first appearance in the Bathurst Top 10 shootout. Only Brad Jones and Alan Jones (no relation) had appeared previously. Alain Menu, Tim Harvey, Derek Warwick and Patrick Watts, all British Touring Car Championship regulars, were Bathurst rookies.* Geoff Brabham became the first third member of a family to appear in the Top 10 runoff following his father Jack (1978) and his 1997 co-driver, his younger brother David (1993). As of the 2015 race, this is the last time the name Brabham has appeared in the runoff.* Appearing in his first Top 10 runoff, Steven Richards, the son of then 5 time Great Race winner Jim Richards, joined David and Geoff Brabham and Steven Johnson (the son of 3 time winner Dick Johnson) as second generation drivers whose fathers had also appeared in the runoff.

Official results

Statistics
 Provisional Pole Position – #83 Geoff Brabham – 2:17.4276
 Pole Position – #2 Paul Morris – 2:16.5958
 Fastest Lap – #3 Jason Plato – 2:16.8034 – Lap 5 (Super Touring lap record)
 Average Speed – 150 km/h
 Race Time – 6:41:25.4072

References

External links
 Official race results
 1997 Bathurst 1000 at www.supertouringregister.com

Motorsport in Bathurst, New South Wales
AMP Bathurst 1000